Bolsheromanovka is a rural locality (a selo) and the administrative center of Bolsheromanovsky Selsoviet, Tabunsky District, Altai Krai, Russia. The population was 699 as of 2013. There are 8 streets.

Geography 
Bolsheromanovka is located 51 km north of Tabuny (the district's administrative centre) by road. Vesyoloye is the nearest rural locality.

References 

Rural localities in Tabunsky District